The seventh season of the American reality talent show The Voice premiered on September 22, 2014, on NBC. Carson Daly returns as the show's host. Adam Levine and Blake Shelton returned as coaches, while Gwen Stefani and Pharrell Williams joined as new coaches, replacing Shakira and Usher.

Craig Wayne Boyd was named the winner of this season, marking Shelton's fourth victory as a coach, and making Boyd the second stolen artist to win the show.

Coaches 
Veteran coaches Adam Levine and Blake Shelton were joined by Pharrell Williams and Gwen Stefani, who replaced Usher and Shakira. The team advisors in this season include Stevie Nicks for Team Adam, Bush frontman Gavin Rossdale for Team Gwen, Little Big Town for Team Blake and Alicia Keys for Team Pharrell, along with Taylor Swift serving as an advisor for all teams during the knockouts.

Teams
Color key

Blind auditions
The Blind Auditions were taped on June 7–8, 2014. The first episode of the Blind Auditions premiered on September 22, 2014.

Color key

Episode 1 (Sept. 22)
The four coaches performed "Hella Good" at the start of the show.

Episode 2 (Sept. 23)

Episode 3 (Sept. 29)

Episode 4 (Sept. 30)

Episode 5 (Oct. 6)

The Battles
The Battles (episodes 7 to 12) consisted of two two-hour episodes and two one-hour episodes each on October 13, 14, 20 and 21, 2014. Season seven's advisors are Stevie Nicks for Team Adam, Alicia Keys for Team Pharrell, Gavin Rossdale for Team Gwen and Little Big Town members Phillip Sweet, Kimberly Schlapman-Roads, Jimi Westbrook and Karen Fairchild for Team Blake.

Color key:

 Episodes airing on Monday had a running time of two hours.
 Episodes airing on Tuesday & Sunday had a running time of one hour.

The Knockouts
The knockouts returned as a stage after being absent on the previous season. For the knockouts, Taylor Swift was assigned as a mentor for contestants on all four teams for this round.

Color key:

 Episodes airing on Monday had a running time of two hours.
 Episodes airing on Tuesday had a running time of one hour.

Live shows
Color key:

Week 1: Live playoffs (Nov. 10, 11, & 12)
The Live Playoffs consisted of three episodes, where 20 artists perform for 12 places in the live shows. The two artists per each team advances via public vote, while the bottom three artists compete for the coaches' save in the results show.

The iTunes bonus multiplier returns for the live rounds, restored to its original factor of 10, though with the continuing iTunes voting limitations were established in season six. Teams Adam and Blake performed on Monday night, followed by Teams Gwen and Pharrell on Tuesday.

Week 2: Top 12 (Nov. 17 & 18)
The Top 12 performed on Monday, November 17, 2014, with the results following on Tuesday, November 18, 2014. The Instant Save returned once again this season, with the bottom three artists performing for a spot in the next round via the viewers' votes from Twitter, which is applicable until the quarterfinals. In a new twist, a Wild Card finalist round was announced during the results show where previously eliminated contestants from the season's top twelve will return to compete in a sing-off for a fourth spot in the finals.

iTunes multiplier bonus was awarded to Matt McAndrew (#5) and Taylor John Williams (#10) .

Week 3: Top 10 (Nov. 24 & 25)
The Top 10 performed on Monday, November 24, 2014, with the results following on Tuesday, November 25, 2014. This time, the coaches chose the song for their artist.

The performance show was suspended in the Eastern and Central time zones for approximately a half hour at 9 p.m. ET due to the grand jury decision resulting from the shooting of Michael Brown by police in Ferguson, Missouri (and the unrest that followed). When NBC News coverage ended, the program resumed from the point at which it had been suspended. Viewers in the Mountain time zone saw the live coverage at 7 p.m., when the episode was supposed to start, then the performance show was shown on a delay; however, the part announcing the start of the NBC News special report was edited out as the show aired in real time. The episodes aired without any interruption for Pacific time zone, and in the states of Alaska and Hawaii.

iTunes multiplier bonus was awarded to Craig Wayne Boyd (#6).

Week 4: Quarterfinals (Dec. 1 & 2)
The Top 8 performed on Monday, December 1, 2014, with the results following on Tuesday, December 2, 2014. Three artists were eliminated this week with the bottom half of the artists facing the Instant Save.

iTunes bonus multipliers were awarded to Matt McAndrew (#2), Taylor John Williams (#6), and Damien (#7).

With the eliminations of Luke Wade and DaNica Shirey, Williams no longer has any contestants remaining on his team; for the first time in the show's history, the top 5 were all male artists.

Week 5: Semifinals & Wildcard Round (Dec. 8 & 9)
The Top 5 performed on Monday, December 8, 2014, with the results following on Tuesday, December 9, 2014. This week, each artist will sing two songs; one chosen by their coach, and another selected in tribute to their supporters. The Wildcard Round was held on Tuesday, and nine previously eliminated singers from the season's top 12 were given the opportunity to perform once again, with one contestant awarded a fourth spot in the finale. With the special Tuesday round, the voting window for all methods was shortened to six hours to accommodate announcement of the result during the December 10 Today show; additionally, as with the finale, iTunes bonus multipliers do not apply to the Wildcard voting.

Craig Wayne Boyd, Matt McAndrew, Chris Jamison and Taylor John Williams received the iTunes bonus multiplier with their studio recordings of "The Old Rugged Cross", "Make It Rain", "When I Was Your Man", "Sugar" and "Blank Space" charting at #2, #5, #6 #8 and #9 on the iTunes Top 200 singles chart at the close of the voting window, respectively.

With the elimination of Taylor John Williams, Stefani no longer has any remaining artists on her team. This is the first time a single coach (Levine) has advanced three performers to the final stage of the competition, and this was also the first season with an all-male finale.

Wayne Boyd, McAndrew, and Jamison also recorded songs in the event that they were eliminated that night, which were respectively "Anymore" (Boyd), "Imagine" (McAndrew), and "I'll Be" (Jamison).

Week 6: Finale (Dec. 15 & 16)
The Top 4 will perform on Monday, December 15, 2014, with the final results following on Tuesday, December 16, 2014. This week, the final four performed an original song, a duet with the coach, and a solo song. As with previous seasons, there was no iTunes bonus multiplier applied to songs performed in the finale episodes; all iTunes votes received for the five weeks leading to the finale will be cumulatively added to online, phone and app finale votes for each finalist.

iTunes multiplier bonuses were awarded to McAndrew (#1 & #10), Wayne Boyd (#2), Jamison (#3 & #5) and Damien (#8).

Elimination chart

Overall
Color key
Artist's info

Result details

Teams
Color key
Artist's info

Result details

Performances by guests/coaches

Reception

Ratings
The season seven premiere was watched by 12.95 million viewers with a 3.9 rating in the 18–49 demographic. It was down from last season's premiere by 2.91 million viewers.

Controversy and criticism
The show faced controversy when Rebekah Samarin, a contestant on Team Adam, was the first contestant in the history of the show to make it to the third round of the competition and have all of her performances, including her Blind Audition, Battle, and Knockout round, montaged (not shown in full). Samarin took to Twitter to comment about this, saying "While I am appreciative of the experience, I am baffled by The Voice's blatant disregard and disrespect of my time and efforts."

Artists' appearances in other media
Blessing Offor was on Platinum Hit on Bravo in 2011, where he was eliminated in 11th place
Anita Antoinette sang in the blind auditions for season three, but failed to turn any chairs.
Allison Bray and Tanner Linford sang in the blind auditions for season six, but failed to turn any chairs.
 Taylor John Williams and Ricky Manning later auditioned on the sixteenth season of American Idol but eliminated on Top 40.
 Caitlin Lucia also auditioned on the sixteenth season of American Idol, but was cut in Hollywood Week.

References

External links

Season 07
2014 American television seasons